Patrick Cehlin (pæt-rek se-liːn) (born July 27, 1991) is a Swedish professional ice hockey player, currently an unrestricted free agent. He most recently played for Luleå HF in the Swedish Hockey League (SHL). Cehlin was formerly a prospect for the Nashville Predators of the National Hockey League.

Playing career
Cehlin joined Djurgården's U18 team in May 2006 from his first club, Flemingsbergs IK. He became Swedish U18 champion with Djurgården for the 2007–08 season. Cehlin made his Elitserien debut on December 26, 2008 against Rögle BK, but played in Djurgården's J20-team for most of the 2008–09 season. He scored his first goal in Elitserien on October 8, 2009 against Luleå HF.

Cehlin was drafted in the 5th round (126th overall) of the 2010 NHL draft by the Nashville Predators. He was signed to a three-year entry level contract with the Predators on June 5, 2012. Cehlin played his first North American game on October 12, 2012, against the Grand Rapids Griffins as a member of the Milwaukee Admirals where he tallied his first two career goals.

On May 19, 2015, after spending half of the previous season in Sweden on loan from the Predators with Leksands IF, Cehlin opted to continue his career in his native land in signing a two-year contract with Rögle BK.

Career statistics

Regular season and playoffs

International

References

External links

1991 births
Living people
Cincinnati Cyclones (ECHL) players
Djurgårdens IF Hockey players
Leksands IF players
Luleå HF players
Milwaukee Admirals players
Nashville Predators draft picks
Rögle BK players
Swedish ice hockey right wingers
Ice hockey people from Stockholm